This is a list of notable waste disposal incidents.

See also
List of environmental issues

 
Waste disposal incidents